When Darkness Falls may refer to:

 When Darkness Falls (novel), 2006 novel by Mercedes Lackey and James Mallory
 When Darkness Falls (1960 film), Swedish film
 When Darkness Falls (2006 film), Swedish film
 When Darkness Falls, song by Killswitch Engage, from the album The End of Heartache